This is a list of defunct airlines of Djibouti.

See also
 List of airlines of Djibouti
 List of airports in Djibouti

References

Djibouti
Airlines
Airlines, defunct